The 1982 Brazilian Grand Prix was a Formula One motor race held at Jacarepaguá on March 21, 1982. It was the second round of the 1982 Formula One season. Many drivers suffered exhaustion because of the intensely hot weather, particularly Brabham drivers Nelson Piquet and Riccardo Patrese. Patrese was forced to retire from the race due to total exhaustion. Piquet, after having finished first in the race and then barely making it to the podium ceremony, fainted due to exhaustion only to be disqualified later.

Qualifying

Pre-qualifying

Qualifying

Race

Disqualifications 

Nelson Piquet finished first and Keke Rosberg finished second, but both were disqualified after the cars were found to be underweight. As a result, the FOCA teams boycotted San Marino GP two races later. The problem was with a  "ballast water tank", ostensibly used to cool the brakes. This would gradually empty during the race and then be replenished at the end so as to pass post-race scrutineering. The FIA Appeals Tribunal upheld the disqualification seven weeks later and these tanks were permanently banned.

Race classification

Championship standings after the race

Drivers' Championship standings

Constructors' Championship standings

Note: Only the top five positions are included for both sets of standings.

References

Brazilian Grand Prix
Brazilian Grand Prix
Grand Prix
Brazilian Grand Prix